Bunker, or Scientists Underground (Russian: Бункер, или учёные под землёй, translit. Bunker, ili uchyonye pod zemlyoy) is a science-fiction mystery television series with comic undertones that was first broadcast on the Russian television network TNT in May 2006.

Series premise
In the year 2012 (a future time when the film was made), an underground laboratory ten kilometres beneath the steppes of Western Siberia is the stage for the top-secret Project BUNKER.  Distinguished scientists have been working on a mysterious scientific experiment for the last three years, with a strange, anonymous, and extremely popular erotic manuscript circulating through the complex serving as their only distraction.  Now a new researcher has arrived — a veterinarian, despite the lack of animals at the facility — and the scientists already in place are wondering why.

Performers
 Yevgeny Stychkin as Pogov
 Aleksandra Kulikova as Masha
 Tomas Motskus as Vasily
 Aleksandr Anurov as Sergey
 Vladimir Bolshov as Pyotr Petrovich
 Galina Kashkovskaya as Tamara
 Ivan Vyrypaev as Gvidon

References

External links
 
 Programme site on Kino Russia

TNT (Russian TV channel) original programming
Russian science fiction television series
2006 Russian television series debuts
2006 Russian television series endings
2000s Russian television series
Russian television miniseries